Parkesburg is a borough in Chester County, Pennsylvania, United States. The population was counted as 3,866 at the 2020 census. The ZIP code is 19365.

History
Parkesburg was first known as the Fountain Inn, a tavern built ca. 1734.  The inn ceased operation as a tavern around 1836 and became Parkesburg's first post office.  In 1872, the Pennsylvania legislature authorized the formation of Parkesburg Borough (from Sadsbury Township).  The town was named after noted politician John G. Parke.  Today, the Fountain Inn is a private residence.

The Parkesburg National Bank and Parkesburg School are listed on the National Register of Historic Places.

Geography
Parkesburg is located at  (39.959066, -75.920447).

Demographics

At the 2020 census, the borough was 71.6% non-Hispanic White, 8.3% Black or African American, 0.8% Native American, 0% Asian, 0% Native Hawaiian or other Pacific Islander, and 9.5% were two or more races. 9.8% of the population were of Hispanic or Latino ancestry 

At the 2010 census, the borough was 81.1% non-Hispanic White, 9.0% Black or African American, 0.9% Native American, 0.3% Asian, 0.1% Native Hawaiian or other Pacific Islander, and 2.1% were two or more races. 7.5% of the population were of Hispanic or Latino ancestry .

As of the census of 2000, there were 3,373 people, 1,243 households, and 870 families residing in the borough. The population density was 2,706.8 people per square mile (1,041.9/km2). There were 1,321 housing units at an average density of 1,060.1 per square mile (408.0/km2). The racial makeup of the borough was 90.93% White, 6.88% African American, 0.15% Native American, 0.15% Asian, 0.03% Pacific Islander, 1.13% from other races, and 0.74% from two or more races. Hispanic or Latino of any race were 3.77% of the population.

There were 1,243 households, out of which 38.5% had children under the age of 18 living with them, 54.9% were married couples living together, 10.5% had a female householder with no husband present, and 30.0% were non-families. 26.4% of all households were made up of individuals, and 13.9% had someone living alone who was 65 years of age or older. The average household size was 2.70 and the average family size was 3.29.

In the borough the population was spread out, with 29.7% under the age of 18, 7.7% from 18 to 24, 31.8% from 25 to 44, 17.5% from 45 to 64, and 13.4% who were 65 years of age or older. The median age was 35 years. For every 100 females there were 93.0 males. For every 100 females age 18 and over, there were 87.9 males.

The median income for a household in the borough was $44,934, and the median income for a family was $55,726. Males had a median income of $38,482 versus $28,262 for females. The per capita income for the borough was $19,080. About 4.6% of families and 7.5% of the population were below the poverty line, including 11.0% of those under age 18 and 8.6% of those age 65 or over.

Transportation

Parkesburg is served by two numbered highways. Pennsylvania Route 10 follows Church Street along a northwest-to-southeast alignment in the eastern part of the borough, while Pennsylvania Route 372 follows Limestone Road and First Avenue along a southwest-to-northeast alignment through the center of town.

Notable people
Jesse Matlack Baker - Pennsylvania politician

See also
Parkesburg Amtrak station

References

External links

Populated places established in 1872
Boroughs in Chester County, Pennsylvania
1872 establishments in Pennsylvania